ASR may refer to:

Military
 Hull classification symbol for submarine rescue ship in some navies
 U.S. Army Service Ribbon

Organizations and publications
ASR Nederland, a Dutch insurance company
 Academy at Swift River
 Erkilet International Airport, Turkey, IATA code

Science
 Ancestral sequence reconstruction, to infer ancient DNA sequences
 Acute stress reaction to traumatic event
 Adult sex ratio of males to females
 Alkali–silica reaction, affecting sensitive aggregates and causing concrete expansion and failure 
 Analyte-specific reagent, a class of biological molecules
 Asian soybean rust, a plant disease
 Age-Standardized Rates of a phenomenon in a series of populations.

Technology
 Automatic speech recognition
 Automotive shredder residue, of shredded automobiles
 Aquifer storage and recovery, of potable water in an aquifer
 Airport surveillance radar
 Asr (radar), an Iranian radar system
 Arithmetic shift right, a computer instruction
 Answer-seizure ratio, the percentage of telephone calls that are answered
 Traction control system, from German Antriebsschlupfregelung (Acceleration Slip Regulation), system to prevent loss of traction on vehicles  
 Automatic Send Receive on a teletype
 Teletype ASR 33, a specific model teletype, commonly used for early day minicomputers
 Architecturally Significant Requirements

Software
 Apple Software Restore, a command line utility in Mac OS X
 Automated system recovery, a Microsoft Windows XP function

Transport
 Air-sea rescue
 State Railway of Thailand ASR class

Other uses
 Asr, the daily afternoon prayer in Islam
 Accelerated share repurchase, whereby companies buy back shares